Bharat Arun (born 14 December 1962), is a former Indian Test cricketer and bowling coach for the India national cricket team, and the current bowling coach for the Kolkata Knight Riders.

Arun was a medium pacer and an attacking lower order batsman. In the semifinal of the 1986/87 Duleep Trophy he hit 149 and added 221 for the seventh wicket with W. V. Raman as South Zone chased a West total of 516 for the first innings lead . A 107* for India Under-25 against the visiting Sri Lankans just before the selection of the side for the Tests against Sri Lanka won him a place in the side. He was part of the Indian under 19 team that toured Sri Lanka in 1979 under the captaincy of Ravi Shastri. 
Almost 40 years later, Shastri, now the head coach of the national cricket team is insisting that Arun be made the head bowling coach. The BCCI has already announced that Zaheer Khan will be the head bowling coach. He is appointed as bowling coach for team India on 16 July 2017

He played two Test matches of the series with the 3 for 76 in his first match as his best bowling figures (after slipping and falling down, to some hilarity, when he ran in to bowl his first ball). He toured Sharjah in 1987 and appeared in all of India's three matches without distinction. He was a part of the Tamil Nadu team that won the Ranji Trophy in 1987/88. He announced his retirement from first-class cricket in November 1993.

References

External links 
 

Indian cricketers
India One Day International cricketers
India Test cricketers
Tamil Nadu cricketers
South Zone cricketers
Tamil sportspeople
Living people
1962 births
Cricketers from Vijayawada
Indian cricket coaches